Acis and Galatea is a story in Greek mythology.

Acis and Galatea may also refer to:

Acis and Galatea (Handel), a 1718 composition by George Frideric Handel
Acis and Galatea, or Acis et Galatée, a 1686 opera by Jean-Baptiste Lully

See also
Acis (disambiguation)
Galatea (disambiguation)